Colin Longden (born 21 July 1933) is an English former professional footballer who played as a winger in the Football League for Rotherham United and York City. He was capped by England schools.

References

1933 births
Living people
Footballers from Rotherham
English footballers
England schools international footballers
Association football forwards
Rotherham United F.C. players
York City F.C. players
English Football League players